Middleton is a hamlet and farmstead in Perth and Kinross, Scotland.

References

Villages in Perth and Kinross